Trujillo is one of the 20 municipalities (municipios) that makes up the Venezuelan state of Trujillo and, according to a 2011 population estimate by the National Institute of Statistics of Venezuela, the municipality has a population of 54,213. The city of Trujillo is the municipal seat of Trujillo Municipality.

References

Municipalities of Trujillo (state)